A solis ortu usque ad occasum is a Latin heraldic motto roughly meaning "From sunrise to sunset".

Most often cited in the coat of arms of many former Kings of Spain above the crest, it is distinctive in its placement above the crest similar to the Scottish style in slogans versus placement below the escutcheon or order if present. With this element it was intended to manifest that the sun did not set in the dominions of the Spanish Empire, since these were located in both hemispheres. This motto echoed a famous phrase, "en mis dominios no se pone el sol" (in my dominions the sun does not set), attributed to King Philip II.

The ornamented version of the royal arms with the Castilian Royal Crest fell into disuse in the 19th century.

See also
Coat of arms of Spain
Plus Ultra
Castilian Royal Crest
Latin phrases

Notes

Further reading
José de Avilés, Marqués de. Ciencia heroyca, reducida a las leyes heráldicas del blasón , Madrid: J. Ibarra, 1780 (Reimp. Madrid: Bitácora, 1992). T. 2, p. 162-166. .
Castañeda y Alcover, Vicente. Las armas reales de España. Heraldica hispanica.com (in Spanish).

Latin words and phrases
Spanish coats of arms